Federal elections were held in Czechoslovakia on 5 and 6 June 1992, alongside elections for the Czech and Slovak Assemblies. The result was a victory for the Civic Democratic Party–Christian Democratic Party (ODS-KDS) alliance, which won 48 of the 150 seats in the House of the People and 37 of the 150 seats in the House of Nations. Voter turnout was 84.7%.

This would be the last election held in Czechoslovakia. ODS leader Vaclav Klaus insisted that the leader of the largest Slovak party, Vladimir Meciar, agree to a tightly knit federation with a strong central government. Meciar, however, was only willing to agree to a loose confederation in which the Czech lands and Slovakia would both be sovereign. It soon became apparent that a coalition between the two blocs was not feasible, leading Klaus and Meciar to agree to a "velvet divorce." The Federal Assembly formally voted Czechoslovakia out of existence on November 25. Effective on January 1, 1993, Czechoslovakia split into two countries, the Czech Republic and Slovakia.

Results

House of the People

House of Nations

References

1992 elections in Czechoslovakia
Legislative elections in Czechoslovakia
Czechoslovakia
Czechoslovakia